Maigret and the Man on the Boulevard (French: Maigret et l'homme du banc, also published in English as Maigret and the Man on the Bench and The Man on the Boulevard) is a detective novel by the Belgian writer Georges Simenon.

Synopsis

Publication history
Maigret et l'homme du banc was first published by Le Figaro in serial form between 31 January 1953 and 3 March 1953 in 29 episodes. The original book edition was by Presses de la Cité in 1953. The book was written by Simenon while staying in Shadow Rock Farm in Lakeville, Connecticut.

The first English editions were published in 1975 by Harcourt Brace Jovanovich (USA) as Maigret and the Man on the Bench and by Hamish Hamilton (UK) as Maigret and the Man on the Boulevard. Eileen Ellenbogen was the translator.

Adaptations
BBC TV aired an adaption of the novel titled Murder on Monday on 15 January 1962 with Rupert Davies playing Maigret. Jean Richard played Maigret in the French telefilm that aired on 17 October 1973,  and Bruno Cremer played the detective in the French TV version of this book aired on 17 December 1993 which was directed by Etienne Périer.

References

1953 Belgian novels
Maigret novels
Novels first published in serial form
Works originally published in Le Figaro
Belgian novels adapted into films
Presses de la Cité books